Masada is an ancient fortification in the Southern District of Israel.

Masada or Massada may also refer to:
 Siege of Masada, a famous siege and mass suicide at the fortress

Places
 Masada (kibbutz), a kibbutz near the Sea of Galilee, Israel
 Mas'ade, a Druze village in the Golan Heights

Arts and entertainment
 Masada (comics), a superheroine in Youngblood
 Masada (miniseries) (1981), an American television miniseries

Music
 Masada (band), a jazz quartet fronted by avant-garde composer John Zorn
 Masada (album), by Alpha Blondy (1992)
 Masada, a 1997 composition by Ralph Hultgren

Organizations
 Masada Action and Defense Movement, a false flag terrorist organisation in France established by white supremacists
 Masada College, a Jewish primary and secondary school in St Ives, New South Wales, Australia

People
 Masada (wrestler) (born 1981), American professional wrestler
 Masada Iosefa (1988–2021), Samoan professional rugby league player
 Jamie Masada (born 1954), Iranian-born American businessman and comedian
 Kazuhiko Masada (born 1975), Japanese professional wrestler

Military
 IWI Masada, an Israeli semi-automatic pistol
Masada (rifle), the original name of Remington ACR rifle designed by Magpul

See also
 Masada2000, a radical-Zionist website 

Japanese-language surnames